Stadionul Moldova is a sports stadium in Speia, Moldova. It has a capacity of 8,550 with approximately 3,300 seats, making it the fourth largest stadium in Moldova. The stadium is primarily used for football matches and was the home ground of FC Dacia Chișinău.

References

Football venues in Moldova